is a Japanese actress. She is best known as Natsumi Hikari, the female lead in the Kamen Rider Decade television series and films.

She worked under the stage name  from June 2017 to June 2021.

Personal life
On July 1, 2021, Mori announced her marriage to Japanese basketball player Yudai Baba.

Filmography

Television
 Kamen Rider Decade (2009) - Natsumi Hikari
 Samurai Sentai Shinkenger episode 21 (2009-2010) - Natsumi Hikari
 Indigo no Yoru (2010) - Tetsu/Momoko Kawamura
 Keishichō Shissōnin Sōsaka (2010) - Megumi Myōjin
 Kasonsuke no Onna Season 10 episode 10 (2010) - Nami Asaba 
 The Fugitive: Plan B episode 3 (2010) - Kieko's stalker
 Keishichō Shissōnin Sōsaka Special (2011) - Megumi Myōjin
 Shitsure Hoken (2011) episode 6-7 - Yuuki Kazuki
 Nazotoki wa Dinner no Ato de episode 8 (2011) - Natsuki Miyamoto 
 Beginners! episode 8 (2012) - Machiko Kosaka 
 Tōkyō Zenryoku Shōjo (2012) - Haruka Kubo
 Dinner episode 5 (2013) - Minami Natsuno 
 Kodomo Kenshi episode 6-10 (2013) - Arisa Arisugawa 
 Mischievous Kiss: Love in Tokyo episode 6-16 (2013) - Yuko Matsumoto
 Meshibana Keiji Tachibana episode 6 (2013) - Yoyogi 
 Shomuni 2013 (2013) - Misuzu Kojima
 Keishichou Sousa Ikka 9-Gakari Season 6 episode 9 (2014) - Misuzu Akimoto 
 Tokyo Scarlet ~  Keishichou NS Kakari episode 6 - Rin Suzuki 
 Borderline (2014) - Akemi Harada
 Tamagawa Kuyakusho Of The Dead episode 1-3 (2014) - Mayu Yamashita
 Dear Sister (2014) - Kazuko Satō
 Itazura na Kiss: Love In Tokyo 2 - Yuko Matsumoto 
 Bittare!!! (2015) - Eiko Sugiyama
 Neko Zamurai Season 2 (2015) - Kikuno
 Konkatsu Deka (2015) - Yayoi Konishi
 Itsuka Tiffany de Chōshoku o (2015) - Noriko Akutsu
 Itsuka Tiffany de Chōshoku o Season 2 (2016) - Noriko Akutsu
 Omukae Desu episode 6 (2016) - Mari Uehara 
 Rent-a-Rescue episode (2016) - Hirako 
  Osaka Kanjousen Part 3 episode 3 (2016) - Hatomi 
  Seigi no Se episode 1 - Miori Mukai 
 Kaishi was Gakkou jane-n da yo (2018) - Reiko 
 Iryu Sousa 5 episode 4 (2018) - Sanami Shikura 
 Cheer Dan (2018) - Ichiko Matsui 
 Sousa Kaigi wa Living de! episode 1 (2018) - Kanako Sakuragi 
 Chuzai Keiji episode 4 (2018) - Risa Tsuyama 
 Kioku Sosa - Shinjuku Higashi-sho Jiken Fairu episode 1-7 (2019) - Mori Chinatsu 
 One Page Love (2019) - Risa Kawana 
 Radiation House episode 1 (2019) - Yumi Kikushima 
 Alibi Kuzushi episode 1 (2020) - Kasumi Nakajima
 ‎My Ex-Boyfriend's Last Will (2022) - Asahi Haraguchi

Films
 Utatama (2008) - Natsumi Shindō
 Cho Kamen Rider Den-O & Decade Neo Generations: The Onigashima Warship (2009) - Natsumi Hikari
 Kamen Rider Decade: All Riders vs. Dai-Shocker (2009) - Natsumi Hikari
 Kamen Rider × Kamen Rider W & Decade: Movie War 2010 (2009) - Natsumi Hikari/Kamen Rider Kiva-la
 Bread of Happiness (2012) - Kaori Saitō
 Taiyō no Suwaru Basho (2014) - Yuki Minakami
 The Next Generation: Patlabor (2015) - Rei Haibara
 Hero (2015) - Saeko Miki
 Rain Tree no Kuni (2015) - Misako
 Bittare!!! (2015) - Eiko Sugiyama
 Erased (2016) - Kayo Hinazuki
 Will You Marry My Wife? (2016) - Yoshiko Kataoka
 Your Eyes Tell (2020)
 Awake (2020) - Hiromi Yamauchi
 Every Trick in the Book (2021)
 Owari ga Hajimari (2021)

Videogames
 Kamen Rider Battle: Ganbarizing (2019) - Kamen Rider Kiva-la (Voice)

References

External links
Official website 

1988 births
Japanese actresses
Japanese female models
Living people
People from Toyama Prefecture
Actors from Toyama Prefecture
Models from Toyama Prefecture